General Svensson may refer to:

Antero Svensson (1892–1946), Finnish Army major general
Bengt Svensson (born 1958), Swedish Army major general
Johan Svensson (Swedish Air Force officer) (born 1962), Swedish Air Force lieutenant general